Dugand's antwren (Herpsilochmus dugandi) is a species of bird in the family Thamnophilidae. It is found in Colombia, Ecuador, and Peru. Its natural habitat is subtropical or tropical moist lowland forests.

The bird is named in commemoration of Colombian naturalist Armando Dugand.

References

Dugand's antwren
Birds of the Colombian Amazon
Birds of the Ecuadorian Amazon
Birds of the Peruvian Amazon
Dugand's antwren
Dugand's antwren
Taxonomy articles created by Polbot